Angshumaner Chhobi (2009) is the debut feature film of Atanu Ghosh and had its premiere at the 40th International Film Festival of India, Goa. It was selected in the Competitive Section of the festival, one of the two Indian entries.

Plot

A journey of four people, Pradyut, Madhura, Neel and Angshuman, through the making of a film. Legendary actor, Pradyut, had chosen a life of exile. Madhura, National Awardee for her debut film, now leads a frustrated existence. Neel, passionate about dance and astronomy, chances on something that changes his destiny. Angshuman, returns from Italy eight years after completing a course in film direction. He has an interesting script on the curious relationship between a septuagenarian celebrity painter and a young nurse. The project is a non-starter with constant setbacks.  A crime occurs brings emotional crises to a peak. Despite all adversities, Angshuman is determined to see his dream project through.

Detailed storyline

Angshumaner Chhobi (a film by Angshuman) deals with the relentless efforts of Angshuman (played by Indraneil Sengupta), a young film director who comes back from Italy after eight years, having studied cinema there, to make his first film. He puts up a determined fight against all obstacles to complete his film. As he is struggling with his goal, the story passes through many mutations - emotional drama, humour and the detection of crime. Along the way, other issues come up. Among these are the eternal tussle faced by every creative person between his mind and his emotions, the psyche of being in and out of the limelight and the inevitable pangs of conscience and humanism faced by celebrities.

In this film-within-a-film, Soumitra Chatterjee has two roles. In the main story, he is a former matinee idol who has become a complete recluse and has cut himself away from the mainstream as much as from cinema. In the film that Angshuman is making, this actor, Pradyut Mukherjee is persuaded to enact the role of a 72-year-old painter suffering from dementia. The painter has an  who looks after him.

In the main story, she is Madhura, an actress who won the National Award for Best Actress in her first film. But when Angshuman approaches her, after a stint in commercial films of little merit but good money, Madhura is now a popular jatra artiste with little connection with films. Angshuman had visualised these two actors for the two main roles for his first film and he is unwilling to compromise.

Tota Roychoudhury plays the enigmatic Neel, who had been passionate about dance and astronomy and gets curiously involved with Angshuman's film.

The detection of crime also plays an important role in bringing out the psychological interactions in a celebrity's life. These are strikingly different from those of the common man. So the usual concept of crime and punishment does not hold true here. An alleged suicide becomes the talk of the town for its mysterious nature and is handed over to the CID, Crime Branch, for investigation. The person assigned to the case is Sourjya Roy, SP, CID, whose no-nonsense analytical skills suggest that it was not a suicide but homicide. Ananya Chatterjee plays the role of this different police officer.

Cast

Indraneil Sengupta as Angshuman
Soumitra Chatterjee as Pradyut
Indrani Halder as Madhura
Tota Roy Chowdhury as Neel
Ananya Chatterjee as Sourya
Sabyasachi Chakrabarty as Bikanranjan
Rudranil Ghosh as Rajiv
Anjana Basu as Sonali
Bhaskar Banerjee as Somnath
Soma Chakrabarty as Bindu
Pijush Ganguly
Debesh Roy Chowdhury
Kaushik Sen

Singers and music
Rupam Islam, Prateek Chowdhury, Subhomita Banerjee, Anwesha Datta Gupta, Sumana Chakraborty and Bhoomi provide vocals on the soundtrack. The film's soundtrack music was composed by Rocket Mondol.

Director's note

I was interested to explore a narrative that runs along three parallel tracks, telescoping into each other to span incidents happening around the same time. The main track is the one that centers on a filmmaker returning to Calcutta after eight years in Italy with the purpose of making his first feature film. The second track probes into the film-within-the-film, that includes the uphill climb the filmmaker goes through to get his principal cast together, then set them through the paces of their work, and so on. This track also explores the sensitive actor’s psyche – the process of being in and out of limelight or the eternal tussle faced by every creative person between his mind and his emotions. The third track, deals with the police investigation of the mysterious death of a successful businessman. Here the detection of crime plays an important role in bringing out the psychological interactions in a celebrity’s life, which are strikingly different from those of the common man.

About the director
A post-graduate in journalism, Atanu Ghosh started his career in 1996 as scriptwriter and director of documentary films. Thereafter, he branched out to fictional serials and short films. Till date, he has directed 23 telefilms. He has also worked as scriptwriter and editor for many eminent directors. Also, he has directed over 75 documentary and corporate films for many reputed organizations. In 2007–08, his play entitled “Ruh-Ba-Ruh”(Face to Face) was produced by National School of Drama, New Delhi as one of their Repertory productions. He has won numerous awards like DD National Award, RAPA Award, Tellysamman, Shyamal Sen Smriti Samman and many others. His second feature film is Takhan Teish (2010).

Awards and festivals
Selected in Indian Panorama and Competitive Section of 40th International Film Festival of India, 2009.
Selected in Competitive Section of 11th Dhaka International Film Festival, 2010.
Winner of 2 Anandalok Awards. Winner of Aravindan Puraskaram for Best Debut Film 2009. Winner of Lankesh Chitra Prashasti for Best Debut Film 2009. BFJA Award for Most Promising Director of 2009. The film also won Best Supporting Actor (Soumitra Chatterjee) and Best Editor (Sujoy Dutta Roy) at the Asia Pacific Film Festival in Taipei, 2010 besides 14 other national and international awards for its cast and crew members.

References

External links
http://www.angshumnerchhobi.blogspot.com

http://timesofindia.indiatimes.com/entertainment/regional/bengali/movie-reviews/Angshumaner-Chhobi/movie-review/4922977.cms
http://sakagaze.blogspot.com/2009/08/angshumaner-chhobi.html

Films set in Kolkata
2009 films
Bengali-language Indian films
Films directed by Atanu Ghosh
2000s Bengali-language films